Bradley Edward McNamara (born 30 December 1965) is a former Australian cricketer who played for New South Wales during the late 1980s and early 1990s. Born in Sydney, McNamara was a right-handed bowling all-rounder, and played for the Australian national under-19 cricket team before playing for New South Wales. In 1999, at the end of his career, he also appeared in a single limited-overs match for the Middlesex Cricket Board.

First-class career
McNamara was an all-rounder for the NSW Blues in Australian domestic cricket for over a decade.  When without injuries he was a regular selection for the Blues, particularly in one-day teams.

As a medium pace bowler, his strength was his ability to worry batsmen with a combination of accuracy and unpredictability. Off a relatively short run, he combined good line and length with difficult to read "change-up" balls, swing and seam.

McNamara was the "man of the match" in his first List A match for New South Wales.

While not noted for big hitting, his hard working and stubborn approach to batting made him a key member of many Blues tail-end partnerships. He still jointly holds the Blues first-class tenth wicket partnership record against Tasmania, an unbroken 138-run stand with Phil Alley. McNamara retired from interstate competition at the end of the 1999–2000 season.

Channel Nine
After his retirement from cricket, McNamara went to work for Channel Nine, becoming their Executive Producer of cricket.

On 6 July 2016, it was announced that McNamara was leaving the network after 17 years. McNamara was quoted as saying "it’s time for him to do something else"

Personal life
McNamara was best man at Australian captain Steve Waugh's wedding.  He played rhythm guitar, lead guitar and supplied backing vocals for Six & Out, a cricket-themed rock band composed of Blues teammates Gavin Robertson, Richard Chee Quee and Shane and Brett Lee.

See also
 List of New South Wales representative cricketers

References

External links
 

1965 births
Living people
Australian cricketers
New South Wales cricketers
Middlesex Cricket Board cricketers
Cricketers from Sydney
Australian rock guitarists